Living in the Danger Zone is a studio album by the blues musician Son Seals, released via Alligator Records in 1991.

Production
The album was produced by Seals and Bruce Iglauer. It was made using Seals regulars and studio musicians, and marked a reconciliation between Seals and Iglauer.

Critical reception
The Chicago Tribune wrote that the album "emphasizes uptempo funky blues, with the occasional classic Chicago shuffle and mid-tempo, minor-key tune for variety." The Washington Post called the album "impressive," writing that Seals "powerfully recites a litany of sorrows against a backdrop of jackhammer drums, organ and occasional horns, playing blistering guitar lines to express what the lyrics can't." The New York Times wrote that "Seals tears into ... the losing-streak lament 'I Can't Lose the Blues' and 'Tell It to Another Fool', a bitter declaration of independence from heartache, with convincing autobiographical zeal, singing with gruff exuberance and unleashing steely outbursts of impassioned, stabbing guitar."

AllMusic wrote that "the self-pitying ballad closer 'My Life' is the worst thing Seals has ever put on tape for Alligator."

Track listing
"Frigidaire Woman" – 5:07
"I Can't Lose The Blues" – 4:28
"Woman In Black" – 3:10
"Tell It To Another Fool" – 4:17
"Ain't That Some Shame" – 3:38
"Arkansas Woman" – 4:29
"The Danger Zone" – 5:04
"Last Four Nickels" – 4:17
"My Time Now" – 6:05
"Bad Axe" – 3:12
"My Life" – 8:07

References

1991 albums
Son Seals albums
Albums produced by Bruce Iglauer
Alligator Records albums